The discography of American indie rock band Grandaddy includes seven studio albums, two live albums, three compilation albums, five extended plays, and sixteen singles.

Albums

Studio albums

Live albums

Compilation albums

Other albums

Extended plays

Singles

Promotional releases

Split releases

Contributions

References

External links
 

Discographies of American artists
Rock music group discographies